L'abbaye truquée, written and drawn by Fournier, is the twenty-second album of the Spirou et Fantasio series, and the author's third, following the Spirou retirement of André Franquin. The story was initially serialised in Spirou magazine, before its release as a hardcover album in 1972.

Story
Spirou, Fantasio and their guest Itoh Kata are visited by Charles Atan and his henchman Renaldo, members of The Triangle, who abduct the Japanese magician as a means of forcing his friends to join their organisation. The trail leads them to an old abbey located in an abandoned village. There, Spip, their pet squirrel, also disappears.

During this time, Kata's kidnappers are unable to keep him captive very long due to his conjuring tricks, no more than Spip who rejoins Spirou and Fantasio. When Spirou and Fantasio finally find Kata, he has just locked up all the men of the Triangle in a cell, with the exception of their leader, Charles Atan, and his assistant Renaldo.

Continuing their search, they prevent the self-destruction of the abbey and capture Atan. But Renaldo frees his boss and the two gangsters flee.

References

 Fournier publications in Spirou BDoubliées

External links
Spirou official site album index 

Spirou et Fantasio albums
Works originally published in Spirou (magazine)
Literature first published in serial form
1972 books
1972 in comics
Comics set in Europe